Pseudopusula californiana, common name the "coffee bean trivia", is a species of small sea snail, a marine gastropod mollusk in the family Triviidae, the trivias.

References

 Fehse D. & Grego J. (2014). Contributions to the knowledge of the Triviidae. XXVIII. Revision of the genus Pusula Jousseaume, 1884 with the description of new genera and new species (Mollusca: Gastropoda). Published by the authors. 144 pp.

External links
 

Triviidae
Gastropods described in 1827
Taxa named by John Edward Gray